Mambru Went to War is a 1985 Spanish drama film directed by Fernando Fernán-Gómez, written by Pedro Beltrán, scored by Carmelo A. Bernaola and starring Agustín González, Emma Cohen, Fernando Fernán-Gómez and María Asquerino. It is set after Francisco Franco's death.

Fernando Fernán Gómez received the Goya Award for Best Actor, and Pedro Beltrán and Agustín González were also nominated to Best Screenplay and Best Supporting Actor respectively.

Cast

References

External links
 

Spanish drama films
1985 drama films
1985 films
Films directed by Fernando Fernán Gómez
Films scored by Carmelo Bernaola
Films shot in Madrid
Films about the Spanish Transition
1986 drama films
1986 films